Cytokine dependent hematopoietic cell linker is a protein that in humans is encoded by the CLNK gene.

Function

MIST is a member of the SLP76 family of adaptors (see LCP2, MIM 601603; BLNK, MIM 604515). MIST plays a role in the regulation of immunoreceptor signaling, including PLC-gamma (PLCG1; MIM 172420)-mediated B cell antigen receptor (BCR) signaling and FC-epsilon R1 (see FCER1A, MIM 147140)-mediated mast cell degranulation (Cao et al., 1999 [PubMed 10562326]; Goitsuka et al., 2000, 2001 [PubMed 10744659] [PubMed 11463797]).

References

Further reading